The 2011 Algerian Athletics Championships was the year's national championship in outdoor track and field for Algeria. It was held on 27 and 28 July in Algiers.

Results

Men

Women

References 

Results
NC  Alger  ALG  27 - 28 July 2011. Tilastopaja. Retrieved 2019-07-06.

2011
Algerian Athletics Championships
Algerian Championships
Athletics Championships
Sport in Algiers